The Upthrown Stone is a 1969 Hungarian drama film directed by Sándor Sára. It was listed to compete at the 1968 Cannes Film Festival, but the festival was cancelled due to the events of May 1968 in France. The film was also selected as the Hungarian entry for the Best Foreign Language Film at the 42nd Academy Awards, but was not accepted as a nominee.

Cast
 Lajos Balázsovits as Pásztor Balázs
 Nadesda Kazassian as Irini, the wife of Iliasz
 Todor Todorov as Iliasz
 László Bánhidi as János bácsi
 István Iglódi as Halmos Jancsi
 Tibor Molnár as Kerék András
 Katalin Berek as the mother of Balázs
 Ferenc Jónás
 Ferenc Némethy as Gönczi
 József Bihari as the grandfather of Balázs
 János K. Szabó
 Lajos Öze as a college teacher
 Arisztea Dini
 János Koltai as Inspector
 János Pásztor as Balázs's Father

See also
 List of submissions to the 42nd Academy Awards for Best Foreign Language Film
 List of Hungarian submissions for the Academy Award for Best Foreign Language Film

References

External links

1969 films
1960s Hungarian-language films
1969 drama films
Hungarian black-and-white films
Films directed by Sándor Sára
Hungarian drama films